Classic is a studio album by American hip hop group Living Legends. It was released on Legendary Music in 2005. It peaked at number 26 on the Billboard Heatseekers Albums, as well as number 38 on the Independent Albums chart.

Critical reception
Dan Nishimoto of PopMatters gave the album 7 stars out of 10, saying: "While Classic never aspires to unify itself around a common theme or the such, it sounds and feels whole because of the common spirit with which each MC approaches their verses." Meanwhile, Dalia Cohen of Exclaim! said: "This is an album that would probably sound dope at a live venue with the energy and vibe that Living Legends would bring to the stage, but for at home listening the mad flows of each emcee gets lost in the background."

Track listing

Charts

Personnel 

 Evren Göknar - Mastering Engineer

References

External links
 

2005 albums
Living Legends albums
Albums produced by DJ Khalil
Albums produced by Eligh
Albums produced by Madlib